Ataollah Salehi (born 9 March 1950) is the former and third commander-in-chief of the Islamic Republic of Iran Army, serving from 2005 until 2017. He graduated before the Islamic Revolution from the Iranian Army's military academy in 1971 with the rank of Artillery Second Lieutenant of the Army's Ground Forces.

He has the direct operational command authority over the commanders of Iranian Army's Ground Forces, Air Force, Navy and Air Defense Base.

As head of Iran's regular military he was a member of Iran's Supreme National Security Council.

Quotes

The enemy has gone insane and given the insane enemy's history, we should always be prepared.

The Iranian nation will observe that we will manufacture the largest destroyer and the most advanced submarines in the region. Mass production of fighter jets, the samples of which were unveiled last year (2008), and plans to manufacture vessels and submarines will be on our agenda in the new (Iranian) year (started 20 March).

Israel can never make its threat operational.

See also 
 List of Iranian two-star generals since 1979

References

1950 births
Living people
Islamic Republic of Iran Army major generals
Commander-in-Chiefs of Islamic Republic of Iran Army
Islamic Republic of Iran Army personnel of the Iran–Iraq War